The China Philharmonic Orchestra (中国爱乐乐团; abbreviated CPO) is an orchestra founded in Beijing, China, on May 25, 2000, based on the previous "China Broadcasting Symphony Orchestra". It is a division of the State Administration of Radio, Film, and Television (SARFT) of the People's Republic of China.

Its inaugural concert was held on December 16, 2000, conducted by artistic director Long Yu. Their first season included the world premiere by Julian Lloyd Webber of the Cello Concerto No. 1 by Philip Glass and the symphonic Beijing opera Women Generals of the Yangs by Du Mingxin, their first commissioned symphonic work.

The CPO has performed in some of the top classical music venues in the United States during several world tours, in Taiwan in 2001 as well as many countries, including Japan and Korea in 2002. Its most lengthy overseas tour was in 2005 visiting and performing in 25 cities in seven European countries and in North America.

In 2014 the CPO made its debut at The Proms, on July 19, 2014, playing works by Elgar, Tchaikovsky, Liszt, Qigang Chen (Joie Éternelle) and Mussorgsky.

The CPO will be a performers for music score for the Indonesian film of the 2000s Heart conducted by an Indonesian composer and conductor Aksan Sjuman to records in Oasis studio, Beijing, China.

See also
List of Symphony Orchestras in Greater China -PRC. HKSAR. Macao SAR and Taiwan

References
SARFT's introductory page of the CPO (in simplified Chinese)

External links
Official website

China Philharmonic Orchestra Performances on YouTube
China Philharmonic Orchestra performs "鼓浪屿之波 The waves of Gulangyu Island " with violinist Nin Feng  宁峰, The Colourful Hulunbeier Children's Choir 五彩呼伦贝尔儿童合唱团,Soprano Zhang Liping 张立萍, Tenors: Zhang Jianyi 张建一、Wei Song 魏松、Zhang Yingxi 张英席
China Philharmonic Orchestra and The Colourful Hulunbeier Children's Choir 五彩呼伦贝尔儿童合唱团 perform 快乐的牧羊人 "Happy Shepherds"
 China Philharmonic Orchestra and Shanghai Opera House' Choir and Soloists perform Mozart's Requiem for Pope Benedict XVI at Vatican
 Beethoven Triple Concerto – Colleen Lee, Trey Lee, Chuanyun Li, China Philharmonic Orchestra (1/4)
China Philharmonic Orchestra plays Mahler Symphony no.4
China Philharmonic Orchestra and Violinist Nin Feng  宁峰 play Bizet's Carmen
China Philharmonic Orchestra plays Franz Lehár's Gold and Silver Waltz
China Philharmonic Orchestra plays Rossini's William Tell Overture 1/2
China Philharmonic Orchestra plays Rossini's William Tell Overture 2/2

Musical groups established in 2000
China orchestras